The 2017 season was Loughborough Lightning's second season, in which they competed in the Women's Cricket Super League, a Twenty20 competition. The side finished fourth in the group stage, winning two of their five matches.

The side was coached by Salliann Briggs and captained by Georgia Elwiss. They played one of their home matches at the Haslegrave Ground, and the other at the County Ground, Derby.

Squad
Loughborough Lightning's 15-player squad is listed below. Age given is at the start of Loughborough Lightning's first match of the season (12 August 2017).

Women's Cricket Super League

Season standings

 Advanced to the Final.
 Advanced to the Semi-final.

League stage

Statistics

Batting

Bowling

Fielding

Wicket-keeping

References

Loughborough Lightning (women's cricket) seasons
2017 in English women's cricket